Tapuk Taku is an Indian politician from the state of Arunachal Pradesh.

Taku was elected unopposed from the Seppa East seat in the 2014 Arunachal Pradesh Legislative Assembly election, standing as a People's Party of Arunachal candidate.

See also
Arunachal Pradesh Legislative Assembly

References

External links
Tapuk Taku profile
Tapuk Taku FB

Indian National Congress politicians
Living people
People's Party of Arunachal politicians
Arunachal Pradesh MLAs 2014–2019
Year of birth missing (living people)
National People's Party (India) politicians